Khairul Helmi Bin Johari (born 31 March 1988 in Sungai Petani, Kedah) is a Malaysian footballer who plays for Malaysia Super League club Kelantan and the Malaysia national team. Khairul plays mainly as a centre-back. He is known as Keon among his teammates and fans.

Career
Khairul played for Kedah youth team, the President Cup team. Khairul has been promoted from the youth team to senior team along with his friends Rozaidi Rahim and Hazwan Zainun starting from 2007/08 M-League season. He signed a professional contract in November 2007. However, Khairul was hit by injuries.

In November 2010, Khairul was called up to the Malaysia national squad by coach K. Rajagopal for the 2010 AFF Suzuki Cup, although he didn't play any games at the tournament as Malaysia won the 2010 AFF Suzuki Cup title for the first time in their history.

In October 2016, Khairul with jersey number 25 has been called up to the National football team for a Class A Friendly match against Singapore. He made his senior debut during that match as a first eleven which end up draw 1–1.

Career statistics

Club

International

Honours

Kedah Darul Aman
 Malaysia Super League (2): 2006-2007, 2007-2008
 Malaysia Cup (3): 2007, 2008, 2016 
 FA Cup Malaysia (4): 2007, 2008, 2017, 2019
 Malaysia Premier League (2): 2005–06, 2015
 Malaysia Charity Shield (1): 2017

Kelantan
 Malaysia Premier League runner-up: 2022

References

External links
 
 

1988 births
Malaysian people of Malay descent
Malaysian footballers
Kedah Darul Aman F.C. players
Melaka United F.C. players
Kelantan F.C. players
People from Kedah
Living people
Association football defenders
Malaysia international footballers